LDJ may stand for:

 The Lemoro language of Nigeria (ISO code: ldj)
 , French branch of the Jewish Defense League
 Linden Airport in the United States (IATA code: LDJ)